Sigovskaya is a rural locality (a village) in Mityukovskoye Rural Settlement, Vozhegodsky District, Vologda Oblast, Russia. The population was 45 as of 2002.

Geography 
Sigovskaya is located 63 km southeast of Vozhega (the district's administrative centre) by road. Galuninskaya is the nearest rural locality.

References 

Rural localities in Vozhegodsky District